Lotus Code is a 2015 Chinese suspense drama film directed by Frank Zhu. It was released on January 16, 2015.

Cast
Lu Nuo 
Pan Yang 
Gao Liwen 
Chen Peisi
Zhu Shimao
Chen Yuemo 
Ying Batu 
Hou Di 
Li Dahai 
Frank Zhu

Reception
By January 16, the film had earned ¥4.45 million.

References

Chinese suspense films
2015 drama films
2015 films